Howard Burnett may refer to:

Howard J. Burnett (1929–2019), American president of Washington & Jefferson College
Howard Burnett (athlete) (born 1961), Jamaican track and field athlete